Sir Matthew Deane, 4th Baronet (c. 1706 – 10 June 1751) was an Irish baronet and politician.

He was the eldest son of Sir Matthew Deane, 3rd Baronet and his wife Jane Sharpe, only daughter of Reverend William Sharpe. In 1747, he succeeded his father as baronet. Deane sat in the Irish House of Commons for Cork City from 1739 until his death in 1751.

He married Salisbury Davis, daughter of Robert Davis. They had three daughters, but no male heir and so Deane was succeeded in the baronetcy by his younger brother Robert.

References

1700s births
1751 deaths
Baronets in the Baronetage of Ireland
Irish MPs 1727–1760
Members of the Parliament of Ireland (pre-1801) for Cork City